Alcaria is a former civil parish in the municipality of Porto de Mós, Portugal. The population in 2011 was 244, in an area of 14.15 km2. On 28 January 2013 it merged with Alvados to form Alvados e Alcaria.

References 

Former parishes of Porto de Mós